The 2012 European Short Track Speed Skating Championships took place between 27 and 29 January 2012 in Mladá Boleslav, Czech Republic.

The original bronze medalist in men's overall competition was Thibaut Fauconnet of France but he was later disqualified for doping offence.

Medal summary

Medal table

Men's events

Women's events

Participating nations

See also
Short track speed skating
European Short Track Speed Skating Championships

External links
Detailed results
Results overview
Results book

European Short Track Speed Skating Championships
European Short Track Speed Skating Championships
European
European Short Track Speed Skating Championships
International speed skating competitions hosted by the Czech Republic
Sport in Mladá Boleslav